Rheidol, formerly named Treze de Maio and Talybont,  was a  steam locomotive built by W.G. Bagnall in Staffordshire, England, in 1896. The locomotive was then regauged and renamed for the -gauge Plynlimon and Hafan Tramway, in Wales, where it worked from August 1897 until 1899. It was then regauged and renamed a second time for -gauge Vale of Rheidol Railway, in 1900. It worked on the Vale of Rheidol until 1924, when it was scrapped.

Construction
The locomotive was originally built by W. G. Bagnall in 1896, following an order for a  gauge locomotive for a sugar plantation in Brazil. The locomotive was named Treze de Maio (Portuguese for "Thirteenth of May"), the date in 1888 that Brazil abolished slavery. It was a  locomotive with outside frames, and fitted with a spark arresting chimney. It was completed and named by February 1897, but the order was cancelled before the loco was exported. This may have been due to a political uprising in Brazil, though this is disputed by railway historian E. A. Wade.

Plynlimon and Hafan Tramway

The Plynlimon and Hafan Tramway was a short-lived  gauge railway built in 1897, operating from Llanfihangel via Talybont to serve lead mines on the western slopes of Plynlimon. The railway's first locomotive, Victoria, was of an unusual design, and not sufficiently powerful to operate on the railway, and the owners of the line approached Bagnall to provide a new locomotive urgently. Bagnall also supplied their works number 1510, Hafan, to work the upper section of the tramway. As Treze de Maio was available, it was regauged and renamed Talybont, and delivered to the Plynlimon and Hafan Tramway in August 1897, still with its spark arresting chimney.

The Plynlimon and Hafan Tramway was not an economic success, and closed in 1899, just two years after opening. Talybont was then sold back to Bagnalls.

Vale of Rheidol Railway

The Vale of Rheidol Railway is a  railway that operates between Aberystwyth and Devil's Bridge, a few miles south of the Plynlimon and Hafan Tramway. Construction started in 1900, and Talybont was sold to Pethick Bros of Plymouth, the contractors working on the railway. The locomotive underwent a second change of gauge, and modification work was also carried out to its cylinders. After completion of the Vale of Rheidol in 1902, the locomotive was returned to Bagnalls for further modifications, before it was named Rheidol and became the railway's No. 3. It was the only locomotive small enough to work the railway's Harbour Branch.

In 1904, Rheidol was fitted with a conventional chimney, and at some point was fitted with a steel cab back. The Vale of Rheidol Railway was taken over by the Great Western Railway (GWR) in 1923 and the locomotive was allocated the number 1198. It was withdrawn in 1923 and scrapped at Swindon Works in 1924, having never carried its GWR number.

See also
 List of Vale of Rheidol Railway rolling stock

References

External links
Vale of Rheidol Railway

Vale of Rheidol Railway
Plynlimon and Hafan Tramway
Vale of Rheidol Railway; Plynlimon and Hafan Tramway
2-4-0T locomotives
Bagnall locomotives
Railway locomotives introduced in 1896
Scrapped locomotives
Narrow gauge steam locomotives
Narrow gauge locomotives of the United Kingdom
Individual locomotives of Great Britain